Marie-Luise Millowitsch (born 23 November 1955) is a German actress.

Life 
Millowitsch was born on 23 November 1955 in Cologne, North Rhine-Westfalia. She is the daughter of Willy Millowitsch and one of the three sisters of Peter Millowitsch.

She studied veterinary medicine in Munich (doctorate in 1991). She lived with her partner in Cologne. The couple split in December 2009 after eight years of relationship.

Filmography (selection)

Cinema movies 

 1991: 
 1992: Wunderjahre
 2004: Guys and Balls
 2011: Ausreichend (short film)

Television movies 

 1965: Drei kölsche Jungen (recording from the Millowitsch-Theater)
 1973: Liebe mit 50
 1975: 
 1975: Probezeit
 1975: Rauschgift
 1978: Tatort: Der Feinkosthändler
 1983: Die Sache Mensch
 1984: Das Glücksmädel
 1984: Das Liebesverbot
 1984: Adel verpflichtet zu nichts
 1984: Die spanische Fliege
 1986: Tatort: Schwarzes Wochenende
 1987: Minipli
 1987: Das Mädchen aus dem Fahrstuhl
 1987: Die vertagte Hochzeitsnacht
 1989: Brausepulver – Berta und die Stürmer
 1990: Der Medienfreak
 1996: Das Traumschiff: Sydney
 1998: Wiedersehen in Palma
 1999: Meine beste Feindin
 2000: Ich kaufe mir einen Mann
 2000: Zwei vom Blitz getroffen
 2002: Die Stimmen
 2003: Lottoschein ins Glück
 2004: Untreu
 2005: Damals warst Du still
 2005: Das geheime Leben meiner Freundin
 2008: Mein Gott, Anna!
 2008: Das Traumschiff: Rio de Janeiro
 2008: Das Traumschiff: Vietnam
 2009: Mein Mann, seine Geliebte und ich
 2009: Heute keine Entlassung
 2010: Scheidung für Fortgeschrittene
 2011: Die Trödelqueen – Gelegenheit macht Liebe
 2012: Idiotentest
 2012: Schlaflos in Schwabing
 2013: Der große Schwindel
 2014: Zwei mitten im Leben
 2015: Eine Handvoll Briefe – Liebe im Gepäck (beim ORF Lost & Found)
 2016: Mama geht nicht mehr

Television series 

 1990: Heidi und Erni (12 episodes)
 1993: Tisch und Bett (1 episode)
 1993: Ihre Exzellenz, die Botschafterin (1 episode)
 1993: Kommissar Klefisch (1 episode)
 1994: Julie Lescaut (1 episode)
 1994: Hallo, Onkel Doc! (1 episode)
 1994: Wir sind auch nur ein Volk (1 episode)
 1995: Sommergeschichten (1 episode)
 1995–2004: girl friends – Freundschaft mit Herz (69 episodes)
 1996: Heimatgeschichten (2 episodes)
 1996: Der Mordsfilm (3 episodes)
 1997–2005: Nikola (title role, 110 episodes)
 1998: Das Amt (1 episode)
 2000: Der Fahnder (1 episode)
 2005–2006: Die Familienanwältin (16 episodes)
 since 2008: Marie Brand
 2014: Danni Lowinski (episode: Grün ist die Hoffnung)
 2016: SOKO Köln (episode: Letzte Meile)
 2019: Käthe und ich – Dornröschen
 2019: Käthe und ich – Das Findelkind
 2019: Ein Fall für Dr. Abel – Zerbrochen

Awards 

 1996: Goldener Löwe (won)
 1998: Adolf-Grimme-Preis (won)
 1999: Deutscher Fernsehpreis (nominated)
 2000: Goldene Kamera (won)
 2002: Bayerischer Fernsehpreis (won)
 2003: Deutscher Fernsehpreis (won)
 2006: Deutscher Fernsehpreis (nominated)

References

External links 

 Mariele Millowitsch on IMDb
 Mariele Millowitsch on filmportal.de
 Literature from and about Mariele Millowitsch on the German National Library

Living people
1955 births
German actresses
Actors from Cologne